The Guldbagge for Best Foreign Film is a Swedish film award presented annually by the Swedish Film Institute (SFI) as part of the Guldbagge Awards (Swedish: "Guldbaggen") to the best Swedish motion picture of the year.

Winners and nominees 
Each Guldbagge Awards ceremony is listed chronologically below along with the winner of the Guldbagge Award for Best Foreign Film and the director associated with the award. Before 1991 the awards did not announce nominees, only winners. In the columns under the winner of each award are the other nominees for best film, which are listed from 1991 and forward.

1980s

1990s

2000s

2010s

2020s

Notes and references

See also 
 Academy Award for Best Picture
 BAFTA Award for Best Film
 Golden Globe Award for Best Motion Picture – Drama
 Golden Globe Award for Best Motion Picture – Musical or Comedy
 Screen Actors Guild Award for Outstanding Performance by a Cast in a Motion Picture
 Academy Award for Best Foreign Language Film (List of Academy Award winners and nominees for Best Foreign Language Film)
 Golden Globe Award for Best Foreign Language Film

External links 
  
  
 

Guldbagge Awards
Lists of films by award
Awards for best film
Best Foreign Film Guldbagge Award winners
Foreign Film